EMM (2-ethoxy-4,5-dimethoxyamphetamine) is a lesser-known substituted amphetamine. It is a dimethoxy-ethoxy analog of trimethoxyamphetamine (TMA-2). EMM was first synthesized by Alexander Shulgin. In his book PiHKAL, both the dosage and duration are unknown. EMM produces few to no effects. Very little data exists about the pharmacological properties, metabolism, and toxicity of EMM.

See also 

 Phenethylamine
 Psychedelics, dissociatives and deliriants

References 

Substituted amphetamines
Phenol ethers